François Hadji-Lazaro (22 June 1956 – 25 February 2023) was a French actor, musician and producer. 

Hadji-Lazaro founded the French independent label Boucherie Productions (1985–2001) and played in many bands such as Les Garçons Bouchers (1986–1995) and Pigalle (1986–2018). 

Hadji-Lazaro appeared in more than 20 films since 1987, including a lead role in Cemetery Man.

Hadji-Lazaro died on 25 February 2023, at the age of 66.

Selected filmography

References

External links 

1956 births
2023 deaths
French male film actors
Male actors from Paris